Juaben is one of the constituencies represented in the Parliament of Ghana. It was created out of the Ejisu-Juaben Constituency in 2012. Juaben is located in the Ejisu-Juaben Municipal District  of the Ashanti Region of Ghana.

See also
List of Ghana Parliament constituencies

References 

Parliamentary constituencies in the Ashanti Region